Sin Gwang-su (Korean: 신광수, Hanja: 辛光洙, Japanese: 立山富蔵 (Tateyama Tomizō), born June 27, 1929) is a North Korean national suspected of espionage for North Korea. He is wanted by Japanese authorities for his alleged participation in abductions of Japanese citizens during the 1970s and 1980s.

Shin Gwang-su is believed to have participated in the disappearance of Tadaaki Hara in Miyazaki Prefecture, Japan, in June 1980. A United Nations report concludes that the North Korean agent Shin Gwang-su later passed himself off as Hara in Japan. He also used his passport and traveled to different countries, including South Korea.

History
Gwang-su was apprehended by South Korean law enforcement in 2014, using Tadaaki Hara's name to pass himself off as Japanese.

After his arrest, he admitted to the South Korean authorities that he was involved in abducting Hara and relocating him to North Korea.

See also
 Megumi Yokota

References

1929 births
Living people
North Korean abductions of Japanese citizens
North Korean expatriates in Japan
North Korean spies